The Brazilian brown bat (Eptesicus brasiliensis), is a bat species from South and Central America.

References

Eptesicus
Bats of Central America
Bats of South America
Bats of Brazil
Mammals of Argentina
Mammals of Colombia
Mammals of Venezuela
Taxa named by Anselme Gaëtan Desmarest
Mammals described in 1819